Streptococcus equisimilis is a species of Streptococcus, initially described by Frost in 1936. As a result of several DNA hybridization studies in 1983, the species was merged into Streptococcus dysgalactiae. Subsequently, S.dysgalactiae was divided into the subspecies Streptococcus dysgalactiae subspecies equisimilis and Streptococcus dysgalactiae subspecies dysgalactiae. Although the name Streptococcus equisimilis is no longer valid, it is still encountered both in clinical practice, and in scientific journals.

References

Streptococcaceae
Obsolete bacteria taxa